Robert John Wildhack (August 27, 1881 - June 20, 1940)  was an American illustrator and comic, who was known on stage, screen and radio for various monologues purporting to analyze sneezes, snores, and hunting.

Biography
He was born on August 27, 1881,  in Pekin, Illinois. He died on June 20, 1940, in Los Angeles, California.

Filmography

References

External links

1881 births
1940 deaths
American illustrators
People from Pekin, Illinois